Jewel Rex Farrior Sr.  (October 5, 1896 – January 17, 1993) was a college football and baseball player and coach for the Florida Gators of the University of Florida, as well as a lawyer. He became a founding partner in a prominent Tampa-based law firm, and remained one of the biggest boosters of the Gators sports program until his death.

Early years
Farrior was born October 5, 1896 in Chipley, Florida to Joseph R. Farrior and Gussie Brown. His father was a physician.

Farrior attended Hillsborough High School in Tampa, where he played football and baseball, graduating in 1913. Future Gator teammate Rammy Ramsdell was in the same class.

University of Florida
Farrior is the namesake of Farrior Hall on the UF campus.

Football
Farrior was a prominent  guard and center for the Florida Gators football team from 1913 to 1916. His first ever game was the 144–0 victory over the Florida Southern Moccasins.

Farrior was captain of the football team in his senior year. In that season the Gators lost all their games, suffering multiple injures and transfers, requiring Farrior to shift to fullback. He broke his ankle that year in the Indiana game. A member of the Kappa Alpha fraternity at UF, the Kappa Alpha Journal reads "J. Rex Farrior of the University of Florida has been for several seasons the 'Gators most  brilliant performer."

He was nominated though not selected for an Associated Press All-Time Southeast 1869-1919 era team. As a football player, he was inducted into the University of Florida Athletic Hall of Fame. The "Rex Farrior Award" was once given to the most "team-oriented" player. Originally the award was given to the defensive lineman who showed the most effort.

Return to UF and coaching
Farrior to Florida in 1921 after serving in World War I to earn his law degree, graduating in 1924.

Gainesville High
From 1920 to 1922, Farrior coached the Gainesville High School Purple Hurricane football team. The 1922 team was his best and won a state title. Athletes who played for him include Jack McDowall, Lamar Sarra, and Goof Bowyer.

Florida

Farrior  coached the 1924 baseball team. In his one-season the team posted a 5–14 record.

Cigar Bowl
Farrior was chairman of the selection committee for the Cigar Bowl.

Law practice
Farrior became a partner in Shackleford and Farrior, which evolved into one of Tampa's largest law firms.  Law partner Bob Shackleford was a former Florida Gator quarterback.  Farrior was elected president of the Florida Bar in 1975.

See also
 List of University of Florida Athletic Hall of Fame members

References

External links
 Interview with J. Rex Farrior, Sr. (September 6, 1980)

1896 births
1993 deaths
20th-century American lawyers
American football centers
American football guards
American football fullbacks
Florida Gators baseball coaches
Florida Gators baseball players
Florida Gators football coaches
Florida Gators football players
High school football coaches in Florida
People from Chipley, Florida
Players of American football from Tampa, Florida
Baseball players from Tampa, Florida
Florida lawyers